Sami Miettinen (born 10 July 1970) is a well-known Finnish author of Non-fiction. He is a major name in current Finnish business literature.

He published Neuvotteluvalta in March 2008. The negotiation theory developed in the book was immediately used by the main Finnish broadsheet newspaper Helsingin Sanomat to rank the leading Finnish politicians.

Despite the good reputation he has gained in Finland his book has not yet been translated into English. However, Miettinen publishes an English language blog about teaching negotiation skills and related issues.

Bibliography

Non-fiction
 The Future of the Euro – The Options for Finland (2014, Libera)
 Neuvotteluvalta (2008, WSOY)

References

1970 births
Living people
People from Lahti
Finnish writers